Cinta Ilahi is a Malaysian television drama series broadcast by JS Pictures Sdn Bhd on 19 December 2014.  It features Johan As'ari, Diana Amir, Dian P. Ramlee and Nazrief Nazri. It aired on 19 December 2014 after 13 successful episodes.

Synopsis
Hud's a wild teenager, though he still hears her mother's words. He works as a slave boy but does not care about his work and likes to hang out. The situation changed when he met Mariam, a pure, beautiful girl. Because he wanted to capture Mariam's heart, he was willing to change by always coming to the mosque and attending religious lecture. Unfortunately, when Mariam was betrothed with Basri. What happens next?

Cast
Johan As'ari as Hud
 Diana Amir as Mariam
 Dian P. Ramlee as Mak Ani
Ramona Zamzam as Zara
 Shakila Khoriri as Shakira
 Nazrief Nazri as Kojek
 Shamsul Ghau Ghau as Ustaz Hashim
 Mubarak Majid as Pak Samad
 Idzham Ismail as Zul
 Syafnida Shuhaimi as Misha
 Nas-T as Amar
 Beego as Basri
 Raja Afiq as Hanif
 Aidil Alias
 Ridzuan Hashim
 Ben Amir sebagai Amir
Nasha Aziz
 Adam Lee as Johan

References

2014 Malaysian television series debuts
2015 Malaysian television series endings
TV3 (Malaysia) original programming
Malaysian drama television series